The Simonyi Professorship for the Public Understanding of Science is a chair at the University of Oxford. The chair was established in 1995 for the ethologist Richard Dawkins by an endowment from Charles Simonyi. The aim of the Professorship is 'to communicate science to the public without, in doing so, losing those elements of scholarship which constitute the essence of true understanding'. It is a position that had been endowed by Charles Simonyi with the express intention that the holder "be expected to make important contributions to the public understanding of some scientific field", and that its first holder should be Richard Dawkins.

History 

Richard Dawkins explained the history of the creation of the chair in a chapter of his memoirs, Brief Candle in the Dark: My Life in Science. In 2008, Dawkins retired and the Oxford mathematician Marcus du Sautoy was elected to the chair.

List of Simonyi Professors 
 1995–2008: Richard Dawkins, biological science
 Since 2008: Marcus du Sautoy, mathematical science

List of Simonyi Lectures 

Richard Dawkins established an annual "Charles Simonyi Lecture" at the University of Oxford. He invited the following speakers:

Marcus du Sautoy, second Simonyi Professor, invited:

Notes and references

Bibliography 
 Richard Dawkins, Brief Candle in the Dark: My Life in Science, Bantam Press, 2015. Chapter "Simonyi Professor", pages 271-307.

External links 
 
 Charles Simonyi's manifesto

Professorships at the University of Oxford
Science education in the United Kingdom
Science in society
1995 establishments in England
Lists of people associated with the University of Oxford
Lecture series at the University of Oxford